The 2020–21 Tunisian Cup (Coupe de Tunisie) or Salah Ben Youssef Cup was the 89th season of the football cup competition of Tunisia.
The competition was organized by the Fédération Tunisienne de Football (FTF) and open to all clubs in Tunisia.

First round

Round of 32

Round of 16

Quarter-finals

Semi-finals

Final

See also
2020–21 Tunisian Ligue Professionnelle 1

References

External links
 Fédération Tunisienne de Football

Tunisian Cup
Tunisia
1